The 2009 NRL Under-20s season was the second season of the NRL Under-20s competition. The Competition, known as the Toyota Cup for sponsorship purposes, is solely for under-20 players. The draw and structure of the competition mirrors that of its first grade counterpart, the National Rugby League.

Season summary

Schedule

Ladder

Ladder progression
Numbers highlighted in green indicate that the team finished the round inside the top 8.

Finals series

The NYC finals series adopts the McIntyre final eight system just like its first grade counterpart, the National Rugby League.

Grand Final

English-born Melbourne young gun Gareth Widdop clinched the Toyota Cup grand final for the Storm with a 74th minute try and pressure conversion, his side downing the Wests Tigers 24-22 on Sunday.

Widdop finger-nailed a late grubber - his second try of the match - to draw his side level at 22-22 before calmly potting the conversion and delivering the second version of the national under-20s competition to Melbourne.

The Storm scored four of their five tries in the first half to lead 18-10 at the break before a burst of two four-pointers in three minutes from the Tigers took them to a 22-18 lead after 56 minutes.

The Tigers had looked to be coming home with a wet sail before Widdop, who missed three first-half conversions, made the difference in a match where the lead changed five times.

The match became a virtual showdown between two gun fullbacks as Wests Tigers tryscoring machine Jake Mullaney took his season tally to 29 tries from 27 games in 2009 with a double of his own.

The speedy Tigers fullback also scored a try on either side of halftime and set up five-eighth Robert Lui's four-pointer for the Tigers' second-half lead.

Melbourne, who finished third in the regular season, had held the ascendancy before that, and led 18-10 at the break with, ironically, Widdop's goal-kicking letting his side down.

The Storm had also been denied three times in the first half, twice with players held up, but scored tries through winger Matt Duffie, lock Billy Rogers, Gareth Widdop and centre Justin O'Neill.

 Melbourne Storm 24 (Gareth Widdop 2, Matt Duffie, Billy Rogers, Justin O'Neill tries; Gareth Widdop 2/5 goals)

 Wests Tigers 22 (Jake Mullaney 2, Rhys Curran, Robert Lui tries; Jake Mullaney 3/4 goals)

Half-Time: Melbourne 18-10

Jack Gibson Medal:  Luke Kelly

Club and Player Statistics

Leading try scorers

Leading point scorers

Leading goal scorers

Leading field goal scorers

Biggest Wins

Winning Streaks

 QF = Qualifying Finals
 GF = Grand Final

Losing Streaks

Awards

Toyota Cup Player of the Year
The winner of the award is decided by the most votes during the year as decided by the referee of each game on a 3-2-1 basis for each game played throughout the regular season.

Winner:
Beau Henry,  St George Illawarra

Toyota Cup team Of The Year
The Toyota Cup team of the Year is voted on by the 16 Toyota Cup coaches, with the players with the highest votes in each position selected.

See also
2009 NRL Under-20s season results
2009 NRL season
2009 Dally M Awards
2009 in rugby league

References

External links
NRL.com - Official site of the NYC, National Youth Competition

 
NRL Under-20s season